Surrealist cinema is a modernist approach to film theory, criticism, and production with origins in Paris in the 1920s. The movement used shocking, irrational, or absurd imagery and Freudian dream symbolism to challenge the traditional function of art to represent reality. Related to Dada cinema, Surrealist cinema is characterized by juxtapositions, the rejection of dramatic psychology, and a frequent use of shocking imagery. Philippe Soupault and André Breton’s 1920 book collaboration Les Champs magnétiques is often considered to be the first Surrealist work, but it was only once Breton had completed his Surrealist Manifesto in 1924 that ‘Surrealism drafted itself an official birth certificate.’

Surrealist films of the twenties include René Clair's Entr'acte (1924), Fernand Léger's Ballet Mécanique (1924), Jean Renoir's La Fille de l'Eau (1924), Marcel Duchamp's Anemic Cinema (1926), Jean Epstein's Fall of the House of Usher (1928) (with Luis Buñuel assisting), Watson and Webber's Fall of the House of Usher (1928) and Germaine Dulac's The Seashell and the Clergyman (1928) (from a screenplay by Antonin Artaud). Other films include Un Chien Andalou (1929) and L'Age d'Or (1930), both by Buñuel and Salvador Dalí; Buñuel went on to direct many more films, never denying his surrealist roots.  Ingmar Bergman said  "Buñuel nearly always made Buñuel films".

Theory 
In his 2006 book Surrealism and Cinema, Michael Richardson argues that surrealist works cannot be defined by style or form, but rather as results of the practice of surrealism. Richardson writes: "Within popular conceptions, surrealism is misunderstood in many different ways, some of which contradict others, but all of these misunderstandings are founded in the fact that they seek to reduce surrealism to a style or a thing in itself rather than being prepared to see it as an activity with broadening horizons. Many critics fail to recognize the distinctive qualities that make up the surrealist attitude. They seek something – a theme, a particular type of imagery, certain concepts – they can identify as 'surrealist' in order to provide a criterion of judgement by which a film or artwork can be appraised. The problem is that this goes against the very essence of surrealism, which refuses to be here but is always elsewhere. It is not a thing but a relation between things and therefore needs to be treated as a whole. Surrealists are not concerned with conjuring up some magic world that can be defined as 'surreal'. Their interest is almost exclusively in exploring the conjunctions, the points of contact, between different realms of existence. Surrealism is always about departures rather than arrivals." Rather than a fixed aesthetic, Richardson defines surrealism as "a shifting point of magnetism around which the collective activity of the surrealists revolves."

Surrealism draws upon irrational imagery and the subconscious mind. Surrealists should not, however, be mistaken as whimsical or incapable of logical thought; rather, most Surrealists promote themselves as revolutionaries.

History 
Surrealism was the first literary and artistic movement to become seriously associated with cinema, though it has also been a movement largely neglected by film critics and historians. However, shortlived though its popularity was, it became known for its dream-like quality, juxtaposition of everyday people and objects in irrational forms, and the abstraction of real life, places, and things. Highly influenced by Freudian psychology, surrealism sought to bring the unconscious mind to visual life. "Balanced between symbolism and realism, surrealist cinema commentated on themes of life, death, modernity, politics, religion, and art itself."

The foundations of the movement began in France and coincided with the birth of motion pictures. France served as the birthplace of surrealist cinema because of a fortunate combination of easy access to film equipment, film financing, and a plethora of interested artists and audiences. The Surrealists who participated in the movement were among the first generation to have grown up with film as a part of daily life.

Breton himself, even before the launching of the movement, possessed an avid interest in film: while serving in the First World War, he was stationed in Nantes and, during his spare time, would frequent the movie houses with a superior named Jacques Vaché. According to Breton, he and Vaché ignored movie titles and times, preferring to drop in at any given moment and view the films without any foreknowledge. When they grew bored, they left and visited the next theater. Breton's movie-going habits supplied him with a stream of images with no constructed order about them. He could juxtapose the images of one film with those of another, and from the experience craft his own interpretation.

Referring to his experiences with Vaché, he once remarked, "I think what we [valued] most in it, to the point of taking no interest in anything else, was its power to disorient." Breton believed that film could help one abstract himself from "real life" whenever he felt like it.

Serials, which often contained cliffhanger effects and hints of "other worldliness," were attractive to early Surrealists. Examples include Houdini's daredevil deeds and the escapades of Musidora and Pearl White in detective stories. What endeared Surrealists most to the genre was its ability to evoke and sustain a sense of mystery and suspense in viewers.

The Surrealists saw in film a medium which nullified reality's boundaries. Film critic René Gardies wrote in 1968, "Now the cinema is, quite naturally, the privileged instrument for derealising (sic) the world. Its technical resources... allied with its photo-magic, provide the alchemical tools for transforming reality."

Surrealist artists were interested in cinema as a medium for expression. As cinema continued to develop in the 1920s, many Surrealists saw in it an opportunity to portray the ridiculous as rational. "Surrealist artists realized that the film camera could capture the real world in a dreamlike way that their pens and paintbrushes could not: superimpositions, overexposures, fast-motion, slow-motion, reverse-motion, stop-motion, lens flares, large depth of field, shallow depth of field, and more bizarre camera tricks could transform the original image in front of the lens into something new once exposed on the film plate.  For surrealists, film gave them the ability to challenge and mold the boundaries between fantasy and reality, especially with space and time. Like the dreams they wished to bring to life, film had no limits or rules." Cinema provided more convincing illusions than its closest rival, theatre, and the tendency for Surrealists to express themselves through film was a sign of their confidence in the adaptability of cinema to Surrealism's goals and requirements. They were the first to take seriously the resemblance between film's imaginary images and those of dreams and the unconscious. Luis Buñuel said, "The film seems to be the involuntary imitation of the dream."

Surrealist filmmakers sought to re-define human awareness of reality by illustrating that the "real" was little more than what was perceived as real; that reality was subject to no limits beyond those mankind imposed upon it. Breton once compared the experience of Surrealist literature to "the point at which the waking state joins sleep." His analogy helps to explain the advantage of cinema over books in facilitating the kind of release Surrealists sought from their daily pressures. The modernity of film was appealing to as well.

Critics have debated whether "Surrealist film" constitutes a distinct genre. Recognition of a cinematographic genre involves the ability to cite many works which share thematic, formal, and stylistic traits. To refer to Surrealism as a genre is to imply that there is repetition of elements and a recognizable, "generic formula" which describes their makeup. Several critics have argued that, due to Surrealism's use of the irrational and on non-sequitur, it is impossible for Surrealist films to constitute a genre.

While there are numerous films which are true expressions of the movement, many other films which have been classified as Surrealist simply contain Surrealist fragments. Rather than "Surrealist film" the more accurate term for such works may be "Surrealism in film."

Surrealist films and filmmakers

Films of the Parisian Surrealist Group 
Entr'acte: a 22-minute, silent French film, written by René Clair and Francis Picabia, and directed by Clair, released December 4, 1924.
The Seashell and the Clergyman: a 31-minute, silent film, written by Antonin Artaud, and directed by Germaine Dulac, released in February 1928.
L'Étoile de mer: a 15-minute silent French film written and directed by Man Ray, released in 1928.
Un Chien Andalou: a 21-minute, silent French film, written by Salvador Dalí and Luis Buñuel, and directed by Buñuel, released in 1929.
Les Mystères du Château de Dé: a 27 minute silent French film written and directed by Man Ray, released in 1929.
L'Age d'Or: a 60-minute French film with sound, written by Dalí and Buñuel, and directed by Buñuel, released in 1930.

Later films 

Joseph Cornell produced surrealist films in the United States in the later 1930s (such as Rose Hobart in 1936). Antonin Artaud, Philippe Soupault, and Robert Desnos wrote screenplays for later films. Salvador Dalí designed a dream sequence for Alfred Hitchcock's film Spellbound (1945). It was one of the first American films to use psychoanalysis as a major element of the story. Hitchcock wanted to capture the vividness of dreams as never before and felt that Dalí was the person to help him do so. Given the importance of the dream sequence, the director gave the artist free rein to bring to the screen an innovative vision of the way dreams could be represented.

Maya Deren made numerous silent short films, among them the renowned Meshes of the Afternoon replete with surreal, dreamlike scenes and encounters.

Jan Švankmajer, a member of the still-active Czech Surrealist Group, continues to direct films.

In 1946, Dalí and Walt Disney began work on a film called Destino; the project was finally finished in 2003.

Many of the films of David Lynch, such as Eraserhead (1977), Lost Highway (1997), Mulholland Drive (2001) and Inland Empire (2006), have been considered surrealist. Other directors whose films have been considered surrealist include: Spanish writer, director, playwright, and member of Breton's Surrealist Group, Fernando Arrabal (I Will Walk Like a Crazy Horse); Chilean writer and director Alejandro Jodorowsky (El Topo, The Holy Mountain); and American director Stephen Sayadian (Dr. Caligari). Another filmmaker and writer known to create surrealist films is Charlie Kaufman. Some of these films include Being John Malkovich (1999), Synecdoche, New York (2008), Anomalisa (2015) and most recently I'm Thinking of Ending Things (2020).

See also 

 Filmmaking technique of Luis Buñuel
 Oneiric (film theory)
 Non-narrative film
 Theatre of Cruelty

References 

Surrealism
Surrealism